The Platinum Film is a film award recognising domestic box office achievements in the Netherlands. It is awarded for the first 400,000 visitors of a Dutch film production. In 2003, one of the requirements for the award was raised from 200,000 to 400,000 visitors.

All films that had received the Platinum Film for 200,000 tickets sold, would also have received the award under the new criterion, with the exception of The Moving True Story of a Woman Ahead of Her Time (2001).

See also
List of films that received the Platinum Film

References

External links
 Platina Film at the website of the Netherlands Film Festival
Golden and Platin Film Netherlands at the Internet Movie Database

Dutch film awards
Film box office